Narimène Madani (born March 12, 1984, in Béjaïa) is an Algerian international volleyball player. She represented the Algerian national team at the 2008 Beijing Olympics.

Club information

Current club :  MB Bejaia (Algeria)

Previous club :  GSP ( ex MC Algiers)

Previous club:  NC Bejaia (Algeria)

Debut club:  MB Bejaia (Algeria)

References

1978 births
Living people
Algerian women's volleyball players
Volleyball players at the 2008 Summer Olympics
Olympic volleyball players of Algeria
Competitors at the 2009 Mediterranean Games
Volleyball players from Béjaïa
Mediterranean Games competitors for Algeria
21st-century Algerian women